"I Can't Live Without My Radio" is the lead single from LL Cool J's debut album, Radio. It was released in 1985 for Def Jam Recordings and was both written and produced by LL Cool J and Rick Rubin. It is a love song to the boombox. The song found modest success, making it to #15 on the Hot R&B/Hip-Hop Singles & Tracks. "I Can't Live Without My Radio" was released with the follow-up single "I Can Give You More". It is the first Def Jam single distributed through Columbia Records.

A section of the song performed by LL Cool J is featured during the auditions process in the 1985 pioneering hip hop movie Krush Groove. This part was created for LL Cool J and another female singer, Nayobe, as an excuse to include their music in the motion picture. LL Cool J himself also has a line, "Box!" (his only line in the movie).

The song was featured in the film Get Rich or Die Tryin', which stars rapper 50 Cent, and was also featured in the soundtrack of the video game True Crime: New York City.

It is number 12 on VH1's 100 Greatest Songs of Hip Hop.

The line from the song "And your Radio's Def when my Record's on" is featured in the chorus of the Eazy-E song "Radio", featured on his debut album, Eazy-Duz-It.

The song was later covered by Minnesota band Halloween, Alaska, and also by British noise rock group World Domination Enterprises.

Track listing

A-Side
"I Can Give You More"- 4:16

B-Side
"I Can't Live Without My Radio"- 4:12

References

1985 singles
LL Cool J songs
Songs written by LL Cool J
Song recordings produced by Rick Rubin
Songs about radio
1985 songs
Songs written by Rick Rubin
Def Jam Recordings singles
Columbia Records singles